Kunzea sericothrix  is a plant in the myrtle family, Myrtaceae and is endemic to Queensland. It is a small shrub with linear to lance-shaped leaves. It is only known from a single collection, and the details of its flowers are provisional.

Description
The branches, leaves and floral cup are covered with long, silky hairs. The leaves are arranged alternately along the branches and are linear to lance-shaped with the narrower end towards the base. The flowers are only known from the buds of a single collection and the description of them is provisional. The flowers are arranged in rounded groups of five to eight flowers on the ends of the branches and are surrounded by egg-shaped bracts and pairs of bracteoles. Flowering occurs in September.

Taxonomy and naming
Kunzea sericothrix was first formally described in 2016 by Hellmut Toelken and the description was published in Journal of the Adelaide Botanic Gardens. The specific epithet (sericothrix) is derived from the Ancient Greek words serikos meaning "silken" or "silky" and thrix meaning "hair", referring to the fine, long hairs covering the plant.

Distribution and habitat
The only collection of this kunzea was from a plant growing in a rocky watercourse in the Eungella National Park.

Conservation status
This kunzea is listed as "endangered" under the Queensland Government Nature Conservation Act 1992.

References

sericothrix
Flora of Queensland
Plants described in 2016
Myrtales of Australia
Endemic flora of Australia
Taxa named by Hellmut R. Toelken